Lise Thiry (born 5 February 1921) is a Belgian scientist and politician. She has been voted one of the top 100 Belgians on a television show on the Belgian French-speaking public channel RTBF.

Early life and education
Lise Thiry was born in 1921 on 5 February in Liège. Her father was Marcel Thiry who was a leading French poet. She was one of three female students, in 1940, who studied medicine at the University of Liège. She graduated in 1946.

Career and research
She went on to research at the Pasteur Institute in Brussels. In 1951, she created a virology department. She developed a method of screening the AIDS virus (HIV).

In 1990, she became a senator. In 2002, whilst championing the rights of asylum seekers she wrote Conversations with the Clandestine Ones.

Thiry turned 100 in February 2021.

Awards and honours
 In 1990, she was voted "Woman of the Year". 
 In 2007, a 70 cent stamp featuring Thiry and the AIDS virus was created. 
 In 2001, she was given the Walloon Merit at the rank of Commander.

References

External links 
 Lise Thiry, BNF.fr

1921 births
Belgian women biologists
Living people
20th-century Belgian scientists
20th-century biologists
20th-century women scientists
Belgian medical writers
Belgian virologists
Belgian women in politics
Belgian women physicians
Physicians from Liège
Women virologists
Belgian centenarians
Politicians from Liège
Women centenarians